Limoncello is an Italian lemon liqueur mainly produced in Southern Italy, especially in the region around the Sorrentine Peninsula and the coast of Amalfi. It is the second-most popular liqueur in Italy and is traditionally served chilled as an after-dinner digestivo. It is also a popular homemade liqueur, with various recipes available online and in print.

Limoncello is made from the zest of lemons and usually has a slightly cloudy appearance, which originates from the presence of small essential oil droplets suspended in the drink.

History
The exact origin of limoncello is disputed. The industry trade group  says that limoncello was created at the beginning of the 1900s by the grandmother of Maria Antonia Farace, who lived in a small guesthouse in Isola Azzurra. US sources say that it was either invented in Sicily about 100 years ago, or that it was first made on the Amalfi coast, where several villages and islands claim to be its place of origin. Journalist Kristen Tillotson reports that it may either have been invented by a citrus-grove tender from Azzurra around 1900 or by monks or fishermen much earlier.

Production
Limoncello is mainly produced in Southern Italy, especially in the region around the Gulf of Naples, the Sorrentine Peninsula and the coast of Amalfi, and islands of Procida, Ischia, and Capri.

Traditionally, limoncello is made from the zest of Femminello St. Teresa lemons, also known as Sorrento or Sfusato lemons.  Lemon zest, or peels without the pith, is steeped in rectified spirit until the oil is released. The resulting yellow liquid is then mixed with simple syrup. Varying the sugar-to-water ratio and the temperature affects the clarity, viscosity, and flavor. It has a slightly turbid appearance, which originates from the presence of small (approximately 100 nanometers) essential oil droplets suspended in the drink. Opaque limoncellos are the result of spontaneous emulsification (otherwise known as the ouzo effect) of the sugar syrup and extracted lemon oils.

Commercial production was about 15 million liters in 2003.

Popularity

Limoncello is the second-most popular liqueur in Italy after Campari.

Serving
Limoncello is traditionally served chilled as an after-dinner digestivo. Along the Sorrentine Peninsula and the Amalfi Coast, it is usually served in small ceramic glasses that are also chilled. This tradition has been carried into other parts of Italy.

Alcohol content
Alcohol content can vary widely, especially among homemade variants, but the typical alcohol content is about 30% by volume.

Variants
Many variations of limoncello are also available. These include arancello (flavored with oranges), agrumello (flavored with mixed citrus), pistachiocello (flavored with pistachio nuts), meloncello (flavored with cantaloupe), and fragoncello (flavored with strawberry).

See also

 Cedratine
 List of lemon dishes and beverages
 Tubi 60
 Villa Massa Limoncello – a brand of limoncello produced in the Sorrento peninsula of Italy

References

External links

Italian liqueurs
Citrus liqueurs
Amalfi Coast
Lemon drinks
Cuisine of Campania
Fruit liqueurs
Italian alcoholic drinks